Below is a list of drinks found in Brazilian cuisine.

Brazilian drinks 

 Aluá – prepared with maize, rice and sugar. It has also been referred to as corn wine.
 Bombeirinho – prepared with cachaça and gooseberry syrup, it is similar to a Kir Royal cocktail.
 Cachaça – a distilled spirit made from sugarcane juice. It is the most popular alcoholic beverage in Brazil. It is also informally referred to as cana, caninha and pinga
 Caipirinha – a cocktail prepared using cachaça, lime juice and sugar
 Caju Amigo
 Cajuína
 Capeta – a cocktail prepared with vodka, guaraná powder and sweet skim milk
 Cauim
 Chá mate gelado –  Roasted erva mate (Ilex paraguariensis) iced tea. Famous in homes and Rio de Janeiro, sold at its beaches.
 Chimarrão
 Guaraná
 Limonada suíça – prepared with lime pieces with peel, ice cubes, sugar, and water. The version with condensed milk is also popular.
 Quentão
 Rabo-de-galo
 Tiquira – a cachaça beverage prepared with manioc
 Vinho Quente
Calicivici a muddled berry drink with wine

See also 
 Cocktails with cachaça

Guarana

References

Drnks
Brazilian
Brazilian drinks